In mathematics, the Gieseking manifold is a cusped hyperbolic 3-manifold of finite volume. The volume is called Gieseking constant and has a closed-form,

with Clausen function . Compare to the related Catalan's constant which also manifests as a volume,

The Gieseking manifold can be constructed by removing the vertices from a tetrahedron, then gluing the faces together in pairs using affine-linear maps. Label the vertices 0, 1, 2, 3. Glue the face with vertices 0,1,2 to the face with vertices 3,1,0 in that order. Glue the face 0,2,3 to the face 3,2,1 in that order. In the hyperbolic structure of the Gieseking manifold, this ideal tetrahedron is the canonical polyhedral decomposition of David B. A. Epstein and Robert C. Penner. The triangulation has one tetrahedron, two faces, one edge and no vertices, so all the edges of the original tetrahedron are glued together. 

The Gieseking manifold has a double cover homeomorphic to the figure-eight knot complement.  The underlying compact manifold has a Klein bottle boundary, and the first homology group of the Gieseking manifold is the integers.

The Gieseking manifold is a fiber bundle over the circle with fiber the once-punctured torus and monodromy given by 
The square of this map is Arnold's cat map and this gives another way to see that the Gieseking manifold is double covered by the complement of the figure-eight knot.

See also

 List of mathematical constants

References

 
 
 

3-manifolds
Geometric topology
Hyperbolic geometry